Dimasa may refer to the following entities in Northeast India :

 Dimasa people, a group of people in present Assam and Nagaland states
 Dimasa language, also called Dimasa-Kachari or Dima-basa, their Sino-Tibetan language
 Dimasa Kingdom, early precursor of the Kachari Kingdom in Medieval Assam
Dima Hasao district, district of Assam in India

See also 
Dimaraji, proposed state of the Dimasa people in northeastern India
Busu Dima, festival of the Dimasa people

Language and nationality disambiguation pages